Michael Murphey is the third album by American singer-songwriter Michael Martin Murphey and his first for Epic Records, released in 1974.

Track listing
 "Nobody's Gonna Tell Me How to Play My Music" (Murphey) – 4:19
 "Healing Springs" (Murphey) – 5:24
 "Rye by-the-Sea" (Murphey) – 3:10
 "You Can Only Say So Much" (Murphey) – 3:24
 "Observer" (Murphey) – 5:06
 "Holy Roller" (Murphey) – 3:59
 "Good Ol' Natural Habits" (Craig Hillis) – 3:17
 "Fort Worth I Love You" (Murphey) – 1:47
 "Ace in the Hole" (Murphey/Hillis) – 3:02
 "Southwestern Pilgrimage" (Murphey) – 3:43

Personnel
Music
 Michael Martin Murphey – vocals, guitar, harmonica, piano, organ, concertina
 Herb Steiner – fiddle, mandolin, steel guitar
 Buddy Spicher – fiddle
 Craig Hillis – guitar
 Bill Farmer – piano
 Bob Holmes – organ
 Tommy Cogbill – bass
 Kenneth A. Buttrey – drums, percussion
 John Hill – drums
 Patricia Henderson – background vocals
 Pat Henderson – vocals
 Clydie King – vocals, background vocals
 Pat Powdrill – vocals, background vocals
 Andy Johnston – vocals, background vocals
 Merry Clayton – vocals, background vocals

Production
 Bob Johnston – producer
 Ben Tallent – engineer

References

External links
 Michael Martin Murphey's Official Website

1973 albums
Michael Martin Murphey albums
Albums produced by Bob Johnston
Epic Records albums